Robbery is the attempt to take the property of another by threat of force.

Robbery may also refer to:

Film and television

Film
 Robbery (1897 film), a British silent comedy short directed by Robert W. Paul
 The Robbery (film), a 1953 Turkish film directed by Sami Ayanoglu
 Robbery (1967 film), a British crime film directed by Peter Yates
 Robbery (1985 film), an Australian television film

Television episodes
 "The Robbery", an episode of Seinfeld
 "The Robbery" (Kitchen Confidential)
 "The Robbery" (Laverne & Shirley)

Music
 Robbery (album), by Teena Marie, 1983
 "Robbery" (Juice Wrld song), 2019
 "Robbery" (Lime Cordiale song), 2019
 "Robbery", a song by Biffy Clyro, a B-side of the single "Mountains", 2008
 "The Robbery", a song by Anne Dudley from the Buster film soundtrack, 1988

Sports
 "Robbery", the 2010s FC Bayern München combination of Frank Ribéry and Arjen Robben

See also 
 Robber (disambiguation)
 Robbery Under Arms (disambiguation)